The Victorian Premier's Prize for Indigenous Writing is a prize category in the annual Victorian Premier's Literary Award. The award commenced in 2004 and in 2012 the prize was valued at A$20,000. The winner of this category prize competes with the other category winners for overall Victorian Prize for Literature valued at an additional 100,000. Nominees are allowed to enter other categories of the Victorian Premier's Literary Awards.

In 2004 Vivienne Cleven was the inaugural winner. The prize value was increased to A$25,000 in 2016.

Winners and shortlists 
Winners of the Overall Victorian Prize for Literature have a blue ribbon.

References 

Victorian Premier's Literary Awards
Australian literary awards
Australian non-fiction book awards
Awards established in 2004
2004 establishments in Australia